Hubert Howe Bancroft (May 5, 1832 – March 2, 1918) was an American historian and ethnologist who wrote, published and collected works concerning the western United States, Texas, California, Alaska, Mexico, Central America and British Columbia.

Early life
He was born on May 5, 1832, in Granville, Ohio, to Azariah Ashley Bancroft and Lucy Howe Bancroft. The Howe and Bancroft families originally hailed from the New England states of Vermont and Massachusetts, respectively. Bancroft's parents were staunch abolitionists and the family home was a station on the Underground Railroad.

Bancroft attended the Doane Academy in Granville for a year, and he then became a clerk in his brother-in-law's bookstore in Buffalo, New York.

Move to California
In March 1852, Bancroft was provided with an inventory of books to sell and was sent to the booming California city of San Francisco to set up a West Coast regional office of the firm. Bancroft was successful in building his company, entering the world of publishing in the process. He also became a serious collector of books, building a collection numbering into the tens of thousands of volumes.

In 1868, he resigned from his business in favor of his brother, A. L. Bancroft.  He had accumulated a great library of historical material and abandoned business to devote himself entirely to writing and publishing history.

Bancroft's library consisted of books, maps, and printed and manuscript documents, including a large number of narratives dictated to Bancroft or his assistants by pioneers, settlers, and statesmen. The indexing of the vast collection employed six persons for ten years. The library was moved in 1881 to a fireproof building and, in 1900, numbered about 45,000 volumes.

He developed a plan to publish a history in 39 volumes of the entire Pacific coast region of North America, from Central America to Alaska. He employed writers and wrote some of the material himself, though he credited only himself as an author. In 1886, the publishing establishment of A. L. Bancroft & Company burned, and the sheets of seven volumes of the history he had written were destroyed.

Personal life
Bancroft's first marriage was to Emily Ketchum in 1859.  They had one child, a girl who was born in 1859, named Kate. Emily died in childbirth in 1869. Bancroft married again in 1879. His second wife was Matilda Coley Griffing, with whom he had four children.

Although he never graduated from college, in 1875 Bancroft was awarded an honorary Master of Arts degree from Yale in recognition of his massive historical work on Native Races of the Pacific States. He was also elected a member of the American Antiquarian Society in 1875.

Death
He died on March 2, 1918, at his country home in Walnut Creek, California. "Acute peritonitis" was blamed as the cause of death in published
newspaper reports. Bancroft was 85 at his death. His body was interred in the Cypress Lawn Memorial Park in Colma, California.

Legacy

In the late 19th century, it was determined that much of the work of which Bancroft claimed authorship had in fact been written by others. This tainted his legacy in the eyes of some scholars, on the principle "false in one thing, false in all." The Salt Lake Tribune called him a "purloiner of other peoples' brains" in 1893.

The Bancroft Library at UC Berkeley, reflects the collector's name. The University of California purchased his 60,000-volume book collection in 1905. Bancroft Way in Berkeley, California, was named in his honor.

In 1885 Bancroft purchased a ranch with an adobe cottage located in Spring Valley, in San Diego County, as a retirement home. The Hubert H. Bancroft Ranch House is now a National Historic Landmark. In addition, part of a property Bancroft bought around 1880 in Contra Costa County, California later became the Ruth Bancroft Garden, when three acres of the remaining farm land was given by Bancroft's grandson Philip to his wife, Ruth Bancroft.

Several schools are named for Bancroft, including Bancroft Middle School (Long Beach, California), Bancroft Middle School (Los Angeles, California), Hubert H. Bancroft Elementary School in Sacramento, Bancroft Middle School in  San Leandro, California Bancroft Elementary School in Andover, Massachusetts,,Bancroft Elementary School in Walnut Creek, California and Bancroft Community School in Spring Valley, California.
Several streets are named in his honor including Bancroft Way in Berkeley, Bancroft Avenue in Oakland and San Leandro.

An archive of Bancroft family correspondence, collected by his daughter Kate, is held in Special Collections and Archives at the Geisel Library at the University of California, San Diego.

Recollections of Hubert Howe Bancroft and the Bancroft Family, an oral history interview with Margaret Wood Bancroft, widow of Bancroft's son Griffing, is held in the Regional Oral History Office of the Bancroft Library at the University of California, Berkeley.

Published works

Bancroft's written works include the following, with the 39-volume set of The Works of Hubert Howe Bancroft (pub. 1874–1890):
 
 
 
  (Remains and Ruins)
 
 
 
 
 
 
 
 
 
 
 
 
 
 
 
 
 
 
  (the Gold Rush years)
 
 
 
 
 
 
 
 
 
 
 
 
 
 
 
  This volume gives an account of his methods of work.
 The Early American Chroniclers (1883)
 Chronicles of the Builders of the Commonwealth: Historical Character Study (1891–1892)
 Book of the Fair (1893)
 Resources and Development of Mexico (1893)
 The Book of Wealth (1896)
 The New Pacific (1912)
 Retrospection, Political and Personal (1912, 1915)
 Why a World Centre of Industry at San Francisco Bay (1916)
 In These Latter Days (1917)

Note on production methods
Bancroft made use of index cards in the organization and compilation of facts for his lengthy and massive series of historical volumes. In the course of his organization of source material and writing, Bancroft made use of scores of research assistants, the contributions of some of whom amounted to the output of co-writers.

Originally he seems to have intended to use topical sections of writing produced by his assistants as the basis of a broad narrative which he himself would write, but as the work progressed he came to use the statements as they were, with only slight changes. He said his assistants were capable investigators, and there is evidence that some of them deserved his confidence; Frances Fuller Victor, in particular, was a well-known author. However, his failure to acknowledge each contribution created doubt about the quality of the work. Overall, although Bancroft considered himself the author of his works, in contemporary terms it is more accurate to consider him an editor and compiler.

Neither Bancroft, nor most of his assistants, had enough training to avoid stating their personal opinions and enthusiasms, but their works were generally well received in their time. Historian Francis Parkman praised Bancroft's The Native Races in The North American Review, but Lewis H. Morgan was more critical, based on his newly published theory of Indian culture, in an article named Montezuma's Dinner. Bancroft's response to Morgan's criticism suggests that he did not understand Morgan's theory, which is now generally accepted by scholars.

Footnotes

Further reading
 John Walton Caughey, Hubert Howe Bancroft: Historian of the West. Berkeley, CA: University of California Press, 1946.
 Harry Clark, A Venture in History: The Production, Publication, and Sale of the Works of Hubert Howe Bancroft. Berkeley, CA: University of California Press, 1973.

External links
 
 
 Hubert Howe Bancroft family papers, circa 1835–1960 at The Bancroft Library
 The Works of Hubert Howe Bancroft: The complete 39-volume set online

 Robert E. Burke Collection. 1892-1994. 60.43 cubic feet (68 boxes plus two oversize folders and one oversize vertical file). At the Labor Archives of Washington, University of Washington Libraries Special Collections. Contains Burke's background notes on H.H. Bancroft.

 
 
 

1832 births
1918 deaths
American book and manuscript collectors
Deaths from peritonitis
Historians of the American West
Historians of California
Historians of Alaska
Historians of Mexico
Historians of British Columbia
History of San Francisco
People from Granville, Ohio
Spanish missions in California
Writers from California
People from Spring Valley, San Diego County, California
Historians of Baja California
Members of the American Antiquarian Society
People from Walnut Creek, California
People from San Francisco
Historians from Ohio
Historians from California
Burials at Cypress Lawn Memorial Park